End of Silence is the debut studio album by American Christian rock band Red. It was released on June 6, 2006 through Essential Records and Sony BMG. It was produced by Rob Graves. According to Billboard, the album made it up to position 194 on its top 200 album chart. This is the only Red album to feature drummer Hayden Lamb.

Guitarist Jasen Rauch explained that "Breathe Into Me" is about "'falling,' finally reaching the end of our rope, where we realize at last... we need God."

The album was nominated for a Grammy for Best Rock or Rap Gospel Album at the 49th Grammy Awards.

Critical reception

Accolades 

In 2007, the album won a Dove Award for Rock Album of the Year at the 38th GMA Dove Awards. It was also nominated for a Grammy for Best Rock or Rap Gospel Album at the 49th Grammy Awards. RIAA has certified "Breathe Into Me" Gold.

Track listing

Personnel
End of Silence album personnel as listed on AllMusic.

Red
 Michael Barnes – lead vocals, piano
 Jasen Rauch – lead guitar
 Anthony Armstrong – rhythm guitar, backing vocals
 Randy Armstrong – bass, backing vocals, piano
 Hayden Lamb – drums, percussion (credited as group member, but does not play on the album)

Additional musicians
 Anthony LaMarchina – cello
 Matt Walker – cello
 Bernie Herms – composer, performer, piano, string arrangements
 Andrew Hendrix – drums, performer on all tracks except "Pieces"
 Steve Brewster – drums, performer on "Pieces"
 Jim Grosjean – viola
 Monisa Angell – viola
 Kris Wilkinson – viola
 David Angell – violin
 David Davidson – string arrangements, violin
 Mary Kathryn Van Osdale – violin
 Pamela Sixfin – violin

Artwork and design
 Stephanie McBrayer – art direction, stylist
 Tim Parker – art direction, design
 Robin Geary – hair stylist, make-up
 Kristin Barlowe – photography

Production and recording
 Rob Graves – audio production, composer, digital editing, engineer, piano, producer, programming
 Ben Grosse – mixing
 Ted Jensen – mastering
 Heather Hetzler – A&R
 Milan Jilek – assistant engineering
 Fred Paragano – digital editing, drum engineering, assistant engineering
 Jason McArthur – composer, executive producer

Certifications

References

2006 debut albums
Red (American band) albums
Essential Records (Christian) albums